The ASTRA Award for Favourite Personality is an award presented at the ASTRA Awards since 2004. Originally presented in gender-specific categories, it was merged into one award in 2010.

Overview
 Award titles (gender categories; 2004-2009)
 Favourite Subscription Television Presenter – Male (2004)
 Favourite Subscription Television Presenter – Female (2004)
 Favourite Male Presenter (2005)
 Favourite Female Presenter (2005)
 Favourite Male Personality (2006-2009)
 Favourite Female Personality (2006-2009)

 Award titles (merged)
 Favourite Personality (2010–present)

Recipients

Males

Females

Merged

 Each year is linked to the article about the ASTRA Awards held that year.

References

Awards established in 2005